The 1925 WAFL season was the 41st season of the West Australian Football League. It was notable as the season where a fully-fledged system of district football was firmly in place after two seasons of planning, with Perth divided into eight zones, one of which was allocated to Claremont in preparation for their entry to senior WAFL ranks for 1926 and another covered the Midland area later to be allocated to Swan Districts. Along with this, the WAFL introduced a reserves competition for players not good enough for their club's league team.

The season saw East Fremantle gain revenge for the previous season's Grand Final loss against a Subiaco team often thought to be the most talented that club had fielded so far in its history with three exceptional finals performances.

A notable incident during the season was a postponement of the Round 12 match between East Perth and West Perth because the Cardinals failed to return on time from a tour of Tasmania, due to being entertained by Senator Pearce in Melbourne the day the ‘Kalgoorlie Express’ was due to leave from Melbourne.

Home-and-away season

Round 1

Round 2

Round 3

Round 4

Round 5 (Foundation Day)

Round 6 (King’s Birthday)

Round 7

Interstate match

Round 8

Round 9

Round 10

Round 11

Round 12

Round 13

Round 14

Round 15

Ladder

Finals

First semi-final

Second semi-final

Final

Grand Final

Notes
The only subsequent King's Birthday games in the WA(N)FL occurred in 1946, the season after government bans on weekday sport during the Pacific War were lifted.Until 1947, WA(N)FL attendances were almost never quantified except for finals matches, and before 1920 they were not quantified even then – gates were used as an indication of the number watching.

References

External links
Official WAFL website
West Australian Football League (WAFL) 1925

West Australian Football League seasons
WAFL